U.S. Open Track and Field was the name of the first top level indoor track and field meet in 2012. The U.S. Open was the opening competition in the 2012 IAAF Indoor Permit Meeting series  and was also part of the Visa Championship Series.  Held in Madison Square Garden in New York City, the inaugural event was announced for January 28, 2012, with television coverage on January 29 at 7 p.m. Eastern Time on ESPN2.

Announced as continuation of a 99-year indoor track and field tradition at Madison Square Garden, the meet displaced the Millrose Games, which has been the longest standing annual event at the arena for the previous 98 years.  The Millrose Games will continue at the Fort Washington Avenue Armory.

The event lasted just one year, and was cancelled in 2013.

Meet Records

Men

Women

References

Recurring sporting events established in 2012
Track and field competitions in the United States
Sports competitions in New York City
Annual sporting events in the United States
IAAF Indoor Permit Meetings
Track and field in New York City